Marco Antonio de la Parra (born 23 January 1952) is a Chilean psychiatrist, writer, and dramatist. Many of his works, which are strongly influenced by the country's 1973–90 military regime, satirize the national condition through metaphors. He is the author of more than 70 titles translated into several languages, including plays, novels, storybooks, and essays.

Biography
Marco Antonio de la Parra studied at the National Institute and later enrolled at the University of Chile, where he graduated as a surgeon in 1976 and specialized in adult psychiatry.

His career as a dramatist began at the university, where he directed the Theater of the Faculty of Medicine from 1974 to 1976, and became known as a playwright. In 1975 he received an honorable mention in the university's dramaturgy competition for Matatangos, disparen sobre el zorzal, which would be released three years later.

In 1978, his play Lo crudo, lo cocido, lo podrido was censored prior to its premiere at the Catholic University. Hernán Larraín, the head of a commission representing the military regime, insisted that this was not a political persecution, writing, "We suppress it for the language and its content, which we consider disrespectful." María de la Luz Hurtado, a researcher for the university's theater school, disagreed with this, writing, "The work was not censored because there was rudeness, but for a political issue, obviously. There is no doubt that what is symbolized there is the authoritarian order."

Between 1984 and 1987, de la Parra directed the company La Teatroneta. He then founded the Theater of the Inextinguishable Passion. He was later artistic director of the Transatlantic Project, for scenic investigation and expanding the exchange of theatrical teaching between Chile and Spain. As an actor, he has interpreted many of his own works.

With Chile's return to democracy, after Augusto Pinochet was forced to surrender power due to his defeat in the 1988 plebiscite, de la Parra was appointed cultural attaché to the embassy in Spain by the government of Patricio Aylwin. He served in this position from January 1991 to September 1993.

On his return from Spain, he was a television critic for the evening edition of La Segunda, under the pseudonym Zap Zap, until 1998. De la Parra has ventured into several literary genres: story, novel, drama, essay, script, and chronicle. In addition, he has taught at the Catholic University, where he was Professor of Dramaturgy from 1993 to 1995. Beginning in 2005, he directed Finis Terrae University's School of Literature of the Faculty of Communications and Humanities and, from 2012 to 2015, its Theater School. At this house of studies he also directs the 21st Century Chair, which puts forward reflections on the great trends that are prevailing in the fields of culture, science, and social disciplines. In addition, he conducts dramaturgy workshops both in Chile and abroad.

As of 2014, he has a column in La Segunda.

In 1997 he was elected an active member of the Chilean Academy of Fine Arts, where he occupies chair No. 22. His works have been translated into several languages.

He is married to the journalist Ana Josefa Silva.

The playwright

Professor Adolfo Albornoz Farías argues that,

Works

 Lo crudo, lo cocido, lo podrido, play, 1978 (reedited by LOM, 2010)
 Lindo país esquina con vista al mar, coauthor, play, 1979
 La mar estaba serena, coauthor, play, 1980 
 Teatro: Lo crudo, lo cocido, lo podrido / Matatangos, disparen sobre El zorzal, Santiago, Chile: Nacimiento, 1983 (prologue by Juan Andrés Piña)
 La secreta obscenidad de cada día, play, 1984
 El deseo de toda ciudadana, novel, Ediciones del Ornitorrinco, 1986; adapted for the theater in 1987 by director Ramón Griffero, and in 2017 by 
 Sueños eróticos/Amores imposibles, stories, Ediciones del Ornitorrinco, 1986  
 Infieles, play, 1988
 Obscenamente (in)fiel o una personal crónica de mi prehistoria dramatúrgica, professional autobiography, Santiago, Planeta, 1988
 La secreta guerra santa de Santiago de Chile, novel, Planeta, Santiago, 1989
 La noche de los volantines, coauthor, play, premiere: 1989, Teatro Ictus, directed by Nissim Sharim
 Cuerpos prohibidos, novel, Planeta, Santiago, 1991
 King Kong Palace o El exilio de Tarzán, play, 1990 (published by Pehuén, together with the following piece)
 Dostoievski va a la playa, play, 1990 (published by Pehuén, together with the previous piece)
 El padre muerto, play, 1991 (Menoría: Ediciones Premio Borne, 1992)
 Dédalus en el vientre de la bestia o Dédalus/Subamérica, play, 1992 
 Telémaco/Subeuropa o El padre ausente, play, 1993
 Tristán e Isolda, play, 1993
 Heroína, play,  Valladolid: Ediciones Premio Caja España, 1994
 El continente negro, play, CELCIT, Buenos Aires, 1994
 Ofelia o la madre muerta, play, 1994
 La pequeña historia de Chile, play, 1994
 La pérdida del tiempo, novel, Editorial Sudamericana, Santiago, 1994
 Cartas a un joven dramaturgo, essay, Santiago, Dolmen, 1995 (Mexico edition in 2007)
 Grandes éxitos y otros fracasos, stories, Planeta, Santiago, 1996. Contains ten previously published stories and six unpublished
 El ángel de la culpa y otros textos, Colcultura, 1996
 La mala memoria. Historia personal de Chile contemporáneo, essay, 1997
 La puta madre, play, 1997 
 La vida privada/La puta madre, Casa de América, Madrid, 1998
 El televidente, essay in which he reflects on his experience as a TV critic in the second half of the 1980s; Planeta, Santiago, 1998 
 Carta abierta a Pinochet. Monólogo de la clase media chilena con su padre, essay, Planeta, Santiago, 1998
 Teatro mutilado de Chile. Caracas and Santiago: Dolmen Ediciones, 1998. Contains:
 Telemaco/Subeuropa (o El padre ausente) y La tierra insomne (o también La Orestiada de Chile [Tragedia griega sin griegos, Orestiada sin Orestes] o más propiamente conocida como La puta madre o igualmente La madre patria)
 Dios ha muerto, play, 1999
 Madrid/Sarajevo, play, 1999 
 La familia, play, 1999
 Heroína. Teatro repleto de mujeres, Cuarto Propio, 1999 
 Manual para entrar al siglo 21, essay, LOM, 1999
 Monogamia, play, 2000
 Novelas enanas, Alfaguara, 2000; contains 11 stories:
 "Bajo la lluvia", "Mi padre hablaba boleros", "Querido Coyote", "Nunca se publicaron: las obras completas de Norton Jaramillo", "Pequeña novela gótica", "El maestro de Claudia", "Paul & John", "Nada es para siempre", "El libro negro del cine chileno", "Arena en las sábanas", and "No te quedes muda" 
 (Estamos) en el aire, play, 2001
 El año de la ballena, young adult novel, Alfaguara, Serie Roja, 2001
 El cuerpo de Chile, Planeta/Ariel, Santiago, 2002
 El cuaderno de Mayra, young adult novel, Alfaguara, Serie Roja, 2002
 Anunciome, poems by de la Parra with drawings by Eva Lefever; BankBoston and Friends of Museums and Fine Arts Corporation, 2002 
 Sobre los hombres (o lo que queda de ellos), Grijalbo, Santiago, 2003
 Sushi, play, 2003
 El Cristo entrando en Bruselas (basado en el cuadro de James Ensor), novel, Editorial Cuarto Propio, Santiago, 2003  
 La sexualidad secreta de los hombres, 2004
 Wittgenstein, el último filósofo, play, 2004
 Te amaré toda la vida, novel, Plaza Janés, 2005
 El teatro, la escena secreta, play, premiered by the Chilean National Theater in 2006
 Crear o caer, essay, Ediciones B, Buenos Aires, 2006
 La cruzada de los niños, play, premiered in 2006
 Decapitation, play; premiered in 2006; directed by Jesús Barranco, Blenamiboá and El Tinglao companies
 Vencer la depresión, psychology, editorial Vergara, 2009 
 Paul & John, theatrical adaptation of the novela enana, brought to the stage in 2010 by Daniel Lattus
 La casa de Dios, 2007
 La entrevista, o El piano mundo
 La secreta obscenidad de cada día, anthology, with prologue by Teresina Bueno; Arte y Escena; 2010, Mexico D.F. Containing: 
 La secreta obscenidad de cada día, Telémaco/Sub-Europa, o El padre ausente, El deseo de toda ciudadana, Querido coyote, and Tristán e Isolda
 El libro de David, 2010
 Para qué leer, 2011
 Ex ex, play, premiered in 2012
 El loco de Cervantes, play, one-person show, premiere: 28 May 2012; direction: Julio Pincheira
 La sangre de Xile, play, premiere: 6 September 2012; direction: Raúl Osorio
 El año que nos volvimos todos un poco locos, book, 2012
 El dolor de Xile, premiere: 4 July 2013, Chilean National Theater; direction: Raúl Osorio 
 La UP, premiere: 2 August 2013, Finis Terrae University theater; direction: Francisco Krebs
 La vida doble, theatrical adaptation of the novel of the same name by Arturo Fontaine Talavera, premiere: 31 July 2014, Finis Terrae theater; direction: Claudia Fernández 
 Los pájaros cantan en griego, premiere: 22 July 2015, Finis Terrae theater; direction: Aliocha de la Sotta 
 El amo, one-person show, 2017

Awards and recognitions

 1979 Latin American Theater Award, New York, for Lo crudo, lo cocido, lo podrido
 1987 Ediciones Ornitorrinco Novel Contest Award for El deseo de toda ciudadana
 1991 Borne Award, Spain, for El padre muerto
 1993 Brief Theater Award, Spain, for Tristán e Isolda
 Andes Foundation Grant (1994)
 Prize of the Chile National Book Council on various occasions (1994–1995 and 2000–2004)
 1996 José Nuez Martín Award for La pequeña historia de Chile
 1996 Association of Entertainment Journalists Award in Best Dramaturgy and Best Assembly for La pequeña historia de Chile
 Guggenheim Fellowship (2000)
 Finalist for the 2000 Altazor Award for Dramaturgy with Madrid/Sarajevo and La puta madre
 Finalist for the 2001 Altazor Award for Dramaturgy with La vida privada
 Finalist for the 2003 Altazor Award for Dramaturgy with Las costureras
 2003 Max Hispanoamericano Award for Performing Arts (General Society of Authors and Publishers of Spain)
 2004 National Book and Reading Council Award for Best Unpublished Theater Work for Australia
 Saulo Benavente Award for the Best Foreign Show presented in Buenos Aires during 2004 for La secreta obscenidad de cada día
 Iberescena Fellowship (2009–2010)

References

External links
 

1952 births
Living people
20th-century Chilean dramatists and playwrights
21st-century Chilean dramatists and playwrights
Chilean autobiographers
Chilean male dramatists and playwrights
Chilean psychiatrists
Instituto Nacional General José Miguel Carrera alumni
Academic staff of the Pontifical Catholic University of Chile
University of Chile alumni
Writers from Santiago